This is a list of plantations and/or plantation houses in the U.S. state of Georgia that are National Historic Landmarks, listed on the National Register of Historic Places, listed on a heritage register, or are otherwise significant for their history, association with significant events or people, or their architecture and design.

See also

History of slavery in Georgia (U.S. state)
List of plantations in the United States

References

Georgia